Wychavon is a local government district in Worcestershire, England, with a population size of 132,500 according to the 2021 census. Its council is based in the town of Pershore, and the other towns in the district are Droitwich Spa and Evesham. The district extends from the southeast corner of Worcestershire north and west. It borders all the other districts of Worcestershire, as well as the counties of Gloucestershire and Warwickshire. 

The district was created under the Local Government Act 1972, on 1 April 1974. It was a merger of the boroughs of Droitwich and Evesham along with Evesham Rural District and most of Droitwich Rural District and most of Pershore Rural District. The district's name, which was invented in 1973, contains two elements. "Wych" recalls the Saxon Kingdom of Hwicca, and "Avon" is for the River Avon. Wychavon District Council was a joint 'Council of the Year 2007', along with High Peak Borough Council. It was also featured as the 'Best Council to work for by the Sunday Times. It increasingly shares management and staff with neighbouring Malvern Hills District Council.

Governance

Wychavon District Council is elected every four years, with currently 45 councillors being elected at each election. Since gaining a majority on the council in 1987 the Conservatives have had control apart from a period between 1995 and the 1999 election when no party had a majority. As of the 2019 election the council was composed of the following councillors:

Wards 
The Wychavon district spreads across the 3 Parliamentary constituencies of Mid Worcestershire, West Worcestershire and Redditch County and comprises 31 wards (represented by 45 councillors) containing 73 Civil parishes.

Civil parishes 
The Wychavon district includes the following civil parishes:

 Abberton Parish Meeting
 Abbots Morton Parish Council
 Ashton under Hill Parish Council
 Badsey and Aldington Parish Council
 Beckford Parish Council
 Bickmarsh Parish Meeting
 Birlingham Parish Council
 Bishampton and Throckmorton Parish Council
 Bredicot Parish Meeting
 Bredon, Bredon's Norton and Westmancote Parish Council
 Bretforton Parish Council
 Broadway Parish Council
 Broughton Hackett Parish Meeting
 Charlton Parish Council
 Childswickham Parish Council
 Churchill Parish Meeting
 Cleeve Prior Parish Council
 Cookhill Parish Council
 Cropthorne Parish Council
 Crowle Parish Council
 Defford and Besford Parish Council
 Dodderhill Parish Council
 Drakes Broughton and Wadborough with Pirton Parish Council
 Droitwich Spa Town Council
 Eckington Parish Council
 Elmbridge Parish Council
 Elmley Castle, Bricklehampton and Netherton Parish Council
 Elmley Lovett Parish Council
 Evesham Town Council
 Fladbury Parish Council
 Flyford Flavell, Grafton Flyford and North Piddle Parish Council
 Great Comberton Parish Council
 Hadzor, Himbleton, Huddington and Oddingley (Saleway) Parish Council
 Hampton Lovett and Westwood Parish Council
 Hanbury Parish Council
 Hartlebury Parish Council
 Harvington Parish Council
 Hill and Moor Parish Council
 Hindlip, Martin Hussingtree and Salwarpe Parish Council
 Hinton-on-the-Green and Aston Somerville Parish Council
 Honeybourne Parish Council
 Inkberrow Parish Council
 Kemerton Parish Council
 Kington and Dormston Parish Council
 Little Comberton Parish Council
 Naunton Beauchamp Parish Council
 North and Middle Littleton Parish Council
 North Claines Parish Council
 Norton and Lenchwick Parish Council
 Norton juxta Kempsey Parish Council
 Offenham Parish Council
 Ombersley and Doverdale Parish Council
 Overbury and Conderton Parish Council
 Pebworth Parish Council
 Peopleton Parish Council
 Pershore Town Council
 Pinvin Parish Council
 Rous Lench Parish Council
 Sedgeberrow Parish Council
 South Littleton Parish Council
 Spetchley Parish Meeting
 South Lenches Parish Council
 Stock and Bradley Parish Council
 Stoulton Parish Council
 Strensham Parish Council
 Tibberton Parish Council
 Upton Snodsbury Parish Council
 Upton Warren Parish Council
 White Ladies Aston Parish Meeting
 Whittington Parish Council
 Wick Parish Council
 Wickhamford Parish Council
 Wyre Piddle Parish Council

References

 
Non-metropolitan districts of Worcestershire